Coosa County is located in the east central portion of the U.S. state of Alabama. As of the 2020 census the population was 10,387. Its county seat is Rockford. Its name derives from a town of the Creek tribe and the Coosa River, which forms one of the county borders.

Coosa County is included in the Talladega-Sylacauga, AL Micropolitan Statistical Area, which is also included in the Birmingham-Hoover-Talladega, AL Combined Statistical Area.

History
The county was established on December 18, 1832, formed from parts of Montgomery and Shelby counties. It gained a small snippet from Montgomery County in 1837 and lost a portion to the south upon the creation of Elmore County in 1866.

Geography
The county is located in the Piedmont region of the state.

Major Highways
 U.S. Highway 231
 U.S. Highway 280
 Alabama State Route 9
 Alabama State Route 22
 Alabama State Route 115
 Alabama State Route 259

Adjacent Counties
Talladega County (north)
Clay County (northeast)
Tallapoosa County (east)
Elmore County (south)
Chilton County (west)
Shelby County (northwest)

Demographics

From 2000 to 2003, Coosa County's growth rate of -5.8% made it the biggest percentage population loser among the state's 67 counties.
Annette Jones Watters of the University of Alabama's Alabama State Data Center cited Coosa as one of eight counties to lose greater than 6% of its population from 2000 to early 2007.

2000 census
As of the census of 2000, there were 12,202 people, 4,682 households, and 3,408 families living in the county.  The population density was 19 people per square mile (7/km2).  There were 6,142 housing units at an average density of 9 per square mile (4/km2).  The racial makeup of the county was 63.94% White, 34.19% Black or African American, 0.32% Native American, 0.04% Asian, 0.01% Pacific Islander, 0.62% from other races, and 0.88% from two or more races.  1.29% of the population were Hispanic or Latino of any race.

There were 4,682 households, out of which 30.00% had children under the age of 18 living with them, 54.80% were married couples living together, 13.50% had a female householder with no husband present, and 27.20% were non-families. 24.30% of all households were made up of individuals, and 9.80% had someone living alone who was 65 years of age or older.  The average household size was 2.52 and the average family size was 2.98.

In the county, the population was spread out, with 23.70% under the age of 18, 8.60% from 18 to 24, 29.00% from 25 to 44, 24.30% from 45 to 64, and 14.40% who were 65 years of age or older.  The median age was 38 years. For every 100 females, there were 104.40 males.  For every 100 females age 18 and over, there were 102.50 males.

The median income for a household in the county was $29,873, and the median income for a family was $36,082. Males had a median income of $25,390 versus $18,171 for females. The per capita income for the county was $14,875.  About 11.80% of families and 14.90% of the population were below the poverty line, including 19.50% of those under age 18 and 13.40% of those age 65 or over.

2010 census
As of the census of 2010, there were 11,539 people, 4,794 households, and 3,293 families living in the county.  The population density was 18 people per square mile (7/km2).  There were 6,478 housing units at an average density of 9.7 per square mile (/km3.8). The racial makeup of the county was 66.3% White, 31.0% Black or African American, 0.3% Native American, 0.1% Asian, 0.1% Pacific Islander, 1.2% from other races, and 0.9% from two or more races. 2.0% of the population were Hispanic or Latino of any race.

There were 4,794 households, out of which 23.0% had children under the age of 18 living with them, 49.5% were married couples living together, 14.1% had a female householder with no husband present, and 31.3% were non-families. 27.9% of all households were made up of individuals, and 11.1% had someone living alone who was 65 years of age or older.  The average household size was 2.38 and the average family size was 2.89.

In the county, the population was spread out, with 20.5% under the age of 18, 7.4% from 18 to 24, 23.2% from 25 to 44, 31.8% from 45 to 64, and 17.1% who were 65 years of age or older.  The median age was 44.2 years. For every 100 females, there were 98.5 males.  For every 100 females age 18 and over, there were 98.7 males.

The median income for a household in the county was $35,560, and the median income for a family was $47,451. Males had a median income of $40,315 versus $26,826 for females. The per capita income for the county was $19,209. About 11.4% of families and 16.0% of the population were below the poverty line, including 20.6% of those under age 18 and 14.2% of those age 65 or over.

2020 census

As of the 2020 United States census, there were 10,387 people, 4,032 households, and 2,657 families residing in the county.

Government
Coosa County is reliably Republican at the presidential level. The last Democrat to win the county in a presidential election is Bill Clinton, who won it by a slim majority in 1996.

Communities

Towns
Goodwater
Kellyton
Rockford (county seat)

Census-designated places
 Equality
 Hanover
 Hissop
 Mount Olive
 Nixburg
 Ray
 Stewartville
 Weogufka

Unincorporated communities
 Dollar
 Fishpond
 Hatchet
 Marble Valley

See also
National Register of Historic Places listings in Coosa County, Alabama
Properties on the Alabama Register of Landmarks and Heritage in Coosa County, Alabama

References

 

Alabama placenames of Native American origin
 
Alexander City micropolitan area
1832 establishments in Alabama
Populated places established in 1832
Counties of Appalachia